"Bitmap file" may be a generic term for:

 A file format for storing raster graphics
 A computer file containing a raster graphics image

Bitmap file may also refer to:

 Windows bitmap, or BMP, a particular graphics file format